Corder may refer to:

Corder (surname)
Corder, Missouri, a city in Lafayette county
Corder House, a building in Sunderland
Commander Corder, a fictional character from the 1995 TV serial, The Final Cut